Jane Teaford (born July 1, 1935) is an American politician who served in the Iowa House of Representatives from the 24th district from 1985 to 1993.

References

1935 births
Living people
Democratic Party members of the Iowa House of Representatives